Champaka is a genus of cicadas in the family Cicadidae. There are about 12 described species in Champaka.

Species
The following species belong to the genus Champaka:

 Champaka abdulla (Distant, 1881) c g
 Champaka aerata (Distant, 1888) c g
 Champaka celebensis Distant, 1913 c g
 Champaka constanti (Lee, 2009) c g
 Champaka maxima (Lee, 2009) c g
 Champaka meyeri (Distant, 1883) c g
 Champaka nigra (Distant, 1888) c g
 Champaka solivenae Lee, 2015 c g
 Champaka spinosa (Fabricius, 1787) c g
 Champaka virescens (Distant, 1905) c g
 Champaka viridimaculata (Distant, 1889) c g- type species (as Pomponia viridimaculata Distant, 1889) 
 Champaka wallacei (Beuk, 1999) c g

Data sources: i = ITIS, c = Catalogue of Life, g = GBIF, b = Bugguide.net

References

Further reading

 
 
 
 

Dundubiini
Cicadidae genera